The following is an incomplete, chronological list of people from Turkey murdered by assassins mainly on political and religious grounds. Many were critical public servants and intellectuals assassinated by far-right proponents of an army-controlled Turkish Republic. Many of the victims have historically been intellectual proponents of laicism and the strict separation of religion and state in Turkey, as defined in the constitution, and diplomats who were victims of militant attacks outside of Turkey.

Mustafa Suphi 
 28 January 1921: Mustafa Suphi was the founder of the Communist Party of Turkey. Suphi and his 14 comrades were assassinated while they were being sent to Erzurum for trial.

Sabahattin Ali 
 2 April 1948: Sabahattin Ali was a writer and critical intellectual who was assassinated at the Bulgarian border while fleeing from Turkey. He had been imprisoned by the Turkish government.

1970s

Mehmet Baydar and Bahadır Demir 
 27 January 1973: Mehmet Baydar was Turkey's consul general in Los Angeles, and Bahadır Demir his deputy, in 1973. Shot in a Santa Barbara hotel by Kourken Yanigian  who had invited them there on the pretext of a donating a painting to the Turkish government. Yanigian, sentenced to life imprisonment, was amnestied in 1984 and died shortly afterwards.

The event is considered to be the first in a decade-long chain of organized attacks against Turkish diplomats by Armenian militant groups.

Daniş Tunalıgil 
22 October 1975: Turkey's Ambassador to Austria Daniş Tunalıgil was murdered by three Armenian gunmen raiding the Embassy in Vienna.

Ismail Erez 
 24 October 1975: Turkey's Ambassador to France İsmail Erez and his driver Talip Yener were murdered by Armenian militants in the vicinity of the Embassy in Paris by car bomb.

Taha Carim 
 9 June 1977: Turkey's Ambassador to the Holy See Taha Carim was killed by the cross fire of two Armenian gunmen in front of the Embassy's residency in Rome.

Bedrettin Cömert 
11 March 1978: Art historian, scholar, literary critic and translator. He was serving on a committee investigating right-wing terror squads at his university.  Shot dead in his car with his wife severely wounded by Rıfat Yıldırım, Üzeyir Bayraklı and by another man nicknamed "Ahmet" who were ultra-nationalists and believed to have been directly funded by the Turkish state. A tribunal found Abdullah Çatlı responsible but nobody was punished as a result.

Doğan Öz 
24 March 1978: Public prosecutor who wrote a report for Prime Minister Bülent Ecevit accusing clandestine groups (later named as Ergenekon) of creating chaos in order to lay the ground for a military takeover. Haluk Kırcı, a Grey Wolves activist, was implicated in his assassination.

Bedri Karafakıoğlu
20 October 1978: Former rector of Istanbul Technical University

Abdi İpekçi 
1 February 1979: Editor of the major national newspaper Milliyet. Killed in his car in the street, where he lived, by Mehmet Ali Ağca, a member of the ultra-nationalist Grey Wolves, who would later try to assassinate the Pope John Paul II in 1981.

Metin Yüksel 
23 March 1979: Islamist political and social activist. Shot to death outside of Istanbul's Fatih Mosque by nationalist gunmen while leaving Friday prayers.

Cevat Yurdakul 
28 September 1979: prosecutor.

Ahmet Benler 
12 October 1979: son of the Turkish ambassador to the Netherlands, Özdemir Benler, murderered by ASALA.

İlhan Egemen Darendelioğlu 
19 November 1979: journalist and writer. Shot to death by unidentified left-wing militants.

Cavit Orhan Tütengil 
 7 December 1979: Professor of Sociology at Istanbul University, columnist of the newspaper Cumhuriyet. Shot dead at a city bus stop in Istanbul.

1980s

Ümit Kaftancıoğlu 
 11 April 1980: TV producer, writer and columnist of the newspaper Cumhuriyet. Gunned down in front of his home in Istanbul as he was about to get in his car.

Gün Sazak 
 27 May 1980: briefly customs and tobacco minister of Turkey and a right wing politician. Murdered in front of his car while putting out baggage. Radical leftist militant group Dev Sol (Revolutionary Left) claimed responsibility for the attack.

Nihat Erim 
 19 July 1980: Prime Minister of Turkey in 1971-1972, for almost 14 months. Shot to death by two gunmen in İstanbul. Radical leftist militant group Dev Sol (Revolutionary Left) claimed responsibility for the attack.

Kemal Türkler 
 22 July 1980: Socialist trade union leader and left-wing politician. Murdered in front of his home by ultra-right militants.

Şarık Arıyak
17 December 1980: Turkish chief consul in Sydney. Killed together with his bodyguard Engin Sever. The Justice Commandos of the Armenian Genocide claimed responsibility.

Kemal Arıkan
28 January 1982: Turkish diplomat Kemal Arıkan shot to death by two gunmen of Armenian origin in Los Angeles.

Atilla Altıkat 
 23 August 1982:  Turkish military attaché in Canada. Assassinated in his car while driving in Ottawa by the Justice Commandos Against Armenian Genocide.

Esat Oktay Yıldıran 
 22 October 1988: Military officer and former internal security chief of Diyarbakır Prison. Shot dead in a public bus in Istanbul by a PKK militant.

1990s

Muammer Aksoy 
 31 January 1990: Professor of law at Ankara University, Faculty of Political science; author of books on Kemalism; elected head of the Ankara Bar Association 1969, columnist of the newspaper Cumhuriyet. Shot in the back of his head in front of his house.

Çetin Emeç 
 7 March 1990: Journalist, editor-in-chief and chief columnist of the liberal rightist daily Hürriyet. Shot to death in front of his house. Case remains unresolved.

Turan Dursun 
 4 September 1990: Former member of Islamic clergy who became a critic of Islam and advocate of atheism. Shot to death in front of his house. Case remains unresolved.

Bahriye Üçok 
 6 October 1990: Female academic, pro-secular theologist, columnist of the newspaper Cumhuriyet. Killed by a parcel bomb.

Hulusi Sayın
 30 January 1991: Retired lieutenant general. Shot dead in front of his house. Claimed by Dev-Sol.

Memduh Ünlütürk
 7 April 1991: Retired general. Shot dead at his house by Dev-Sol.

Kemal Kayacan 
  29 July 1992: Admiral (retired), former commander of the Turkish Navy. Shot dead in his house.

Musa Anter 
1992: Kurdish writer, assassinated in Diyarbakır. European Court of Human Rights fined Turkey for this assassination, allegedly committed by JITEM illegal gendarmerie unit.

Zübeyir Akkoç 

 13 January 1993: Union member of Kurdish origin. His murder led to the European Court of Human Rights case Akkoç v. Turkey (2000).

Uğur Mumcu 
 24 January 1993: Research journalist,  columnist of the major newspaper Cumhuriyet. Killed in front of his home in Ankara by a bomb installed in his car.

Cem Ersever
 4 November 1993: ex-JITEM commander who had begun speaking to the press.

Onat Kutlar 
 11 January 1995: prominent art critic, writer, poet, columnist for the daily Cumhuriyet and one of the founders of the Istanbul International Film Festival, died of injuries he suffered during a bomb attack perpetrated by PKK at a hotel in İstanbul.

Metin Göktepe 
 8 January 1996: , a left wing journalist of Evrensel was beaten to death by Turkish police while covering civil unrest in the Gazi district of Istanbul. The first case in Turkey where the police were convicted of murder.

Özdemir Sabancı 
 9 January 1996: Businessman and a member of the Sabancı family in the second generation. Gunned down in his office in Sabancı Towers, Levent, İstanbul, by assassins hired by the leftist armed group DHKP-C. The general manager of ToyotaSA and a secretary was also killed. They had been given access to the building by Fehriye Erdal, a female member of DHKP-C, who was an employee at that time.

Ahmet Taner Kışlalı 
 21 October 1999: Academic, writer. politician, former Minister of Culture and columnist of the newspaper Cumhuriyet. Killed in Ankara by a bomb placed on the windshield of his car.

2000s

Gaffar Okkan 
 24 January 2001: Diyarbakır Police Chief, his driver and four policemen escorting him were shot dead in an attack after they left Diyarbakır Police Department building. Radical Islamic group known as Kurdish Hezbollah was suspected.

Üzeyir Garih 
 25 August 2001: A prominent Turkish Jewish businessman and a founding partner of the Alarko group of companies. He was stabbed to death  in the cemetery of the historic İstanbul quarter of Eyüp.

Necip Hablemitoğlu 
 18 December 2002: A Kemalist historian from Ankara University who was killed in an armed attack near his home in Ankara.

Andrea Santoro 
 5 February 2006: Father Andrea Santoro was a Roman Catholic priest, murdered in the Santa Maria Church in Trabzon where he served as a member of the Catholic Church's Fidei donum missionary program.
On 5 September 2006 he was shot dead from behind while kneeling in prayer in the church. A witness heard the perpetrator shouting "Allahu Akbar". A 16-year-old high school student was arrested two days after the shooting carrying a 9mm pistol. An investigation by the Air Force Office of Special Investigations on stolen weaponry in Iraq revealed that the gun was of the same type used in the supposedly Islamist attack on the Turkish Council of State in 2006.

Mustafa Yücel Özbilgin 
 17 May 2006: Council of State member judge. Murdered during a session in the high court in Ankara.

Hrant Dink 

 19 January 2007: Armenian-Turkish journalist and editor-in-chief of the weekly Armenian and Turkish language newspaper Agos in Istanbul. Shot dead in front of his newspaper's office.

Necati Aydın, Uğur Yüksel and Tilman Geske 
18 April 2007. Three Christian leaders assassinated, two Turkish Pastors and a German missionary.

İhya Balak 
16 November 2007. Director of Milli Piyango, the Turkish National Lottery, was assassinated in his office by an ex-inspector of his directorate.

Ahmet Yıldız 
July 2008: "the victim of what sociologists say is the first gay honor killing in Turkey to surface publicly".

Cihan Hayırsevener 
19 December 2009: founder and editor of the daily Güney Marmara’da Yaşam, was shot in a street in Bandırma, Balıkesir Province and died later that day at a hospital in Bursa. He had reported on corruption charges involving the owners of İlkhaber, another daily in the town.

Andrei Karlov 

19 December 2016: Andrei Karlov, the Russian Ambassador to Turkey, was assassinated by Mevlüt Mert Altıntaş, an off-duty Turkish police officer, at an art exhibition in Ankara,Turkey

Sinan Ateş

See also 
List of assassinated people
List of journalists killed in Turkey
List of massacres in Turkey
Attempted assassination of Pope John Paul II

References 

Lists of Turkish people
 
 
Turkey
Assassinated people